Ricky J. Sethi is an Assistant Professor of Computer Science at Fitchburg State University and the Director of Research for The Madsci Network.  He was appointed as a National Science Foundation (NSF) Computing Innovation Fellow by the Computing Community Consortium and the Computing Research Association. He has contributed significantly in the fields of machine learning, computer vision, social computing, and science education/eLearning.

He has authored or co-authored more than 30 peer-reviewed papers and book chapters and made numerous presentations on his research. He has taught various courses in computer science, physics, and general science.  He was also the Lead Integration Scientist for the WASA  project, supported by the NSF and ONR, as well as part of the UCR DARPA VIRAT program. He was the Local Organizing Chair for the ACM International Conference on Intelligent User Interfaces, a member of IEEE, and the Associate Editor-in-Chief for the Journal of Postdoctoral Research. His work has been featured on The Huffington Post, The Conversation, and The Sentinel.

Education
Sethi received his B.S. in physics and neurobiology from the University of California, Berkeley, his M.S. in physics/information systems from the University of Southern California, and his Ph.D. in artificial intelligence from the University of California, Riverside.  He was a postdoc at the University of California, Riverside and was later appointed a Computing Innovation Fellow at UCLA/USC Information Sciences Institute.

Publications

 Ricky J. Sethi and Yolanda Gil, "Scientific Workflows in Data Analysis: Bridging Expertise Across Multiple Domains". Future Generation Computer Systems (FGCS) (2017)
 Richard De Veaux, Mahesh Agarwal, Maia Averett, Benjamin Baumer, Andrew Bray, Thomas Bressoud, Lance Bryant, Lei Cheng, Amanda Francis, Robert Gould, Albert Y. Kim, Matt Kretchmar, Qin Lu, Ann Moskol, Deborah Nolan, Roberto Pelayo, Sean Raleigh, Ricky J. Sethi, Mutiara Sondjaja, Neelesh Tiruviluamala, Paul Uhlig, Talitha Washington, Curtis Wesley, David White, and Ping Ye, "Curriculum Guidelines for Undergraduate Programs in Data Science". Annual Review of Statistics and Its Application (Annu Rev Stat Appl) (2017)
 Ricky J. Sethi and Yolanda Gil, "Reproducibility in computer vision: Towards open publication of image analysis experiments as semantic workflows". IEEE International Conference on eScience (eScience) (2016)
 Ricky J. Sethi, "Towards Defining Groups and Crowds in Video Using the Atomic Group Actions Dataset". IEEE International Conference on Image Processing (ICIP) (2015)
 Balaji Polepalli Ramesh, Ricky J. Sethi, and Hong Yu, "Figure-Associated Text Summarization and Evaluation". PLOS ONE (2014)
 Ricky J. Sethi, Yolanda Gil, Hyunjoon Jo, and Andrew Philpot, "Large-Scale Multimedia Content Analysis Using Scientific Workflows". ACM International Conference on Multimedia (ACM MM) (2013)
 Ricky J. Sethi and Lynn Bry, "The Madsci Network: Direct Communication of Science from Scientist to Layperson". 21st International Conference on Computers in Education (ICCE) (2013)
 Ayelet Baram‐Tsabari, Ricky J. Sethi, Lynn Bry, Anat Yarden, Asking scientists: a decade of questions analyzed by age, gender, and country, Science Education 93 (1), 131-160 (2009)
 Ricky J. Sethi, Amit K. Roy-Chowdhury, Activity recognition by integrating the physics of motion with a neuromorphic model of perception, Motion and Video Computing (2009)
 Ayelet Baram‐Tsabari, Ricky J. Sethi, Lynn Bry, Anat Yarden, Using questions sent to an Ask‐A‐Scientist site to identify children's interests in science, Science Education 90 (6), 1050-1072 (2006)

References

External links
 Homepage of Ricky J. Sethi
 Google Scholar Profile
 ResearchGate Profile
 OrcID

Living people
American computer scientists
University of Southern California alumni
University of California, Riverside alumni
University of California, Berkeley alumni
American academics of Indian descent
Year of birth missing (living people)